Potsdam is a city in Brandenburg, Germany

Potsdam may also refer to:

Places

Germany
 Potsdam-Mittelmark, a rural district (Kreis) of Brandenburg
 Bezirk Potsdam, a former district (Bezirk) of East Germany
 Kreis Potsdam, a former rural district (Kreis) of East Germany
 Potsdam (region), a former region (Regierungsbezirk) of Prussia

Papua New Guinea
Potsdam (Papua New Guinea), a village in the province of Madang

South Africa
Potsdam, Eastern Cape, a village of Buffalo City, Eastern Cape

United States

Potsdam (town), New York, a town in the State of New York
Potsdam (village), New York, a village in the State of New York
Stuart, Florida, a town in Florida, named Potsdam from 1893 to 1895
Potsdam, Ohio, a village in Miami County, Ohio, United States with a population of about 200
Potsdam, Minnesota, an unincorporated community in Olmsted County, Minnesota

History
Potsdam Agreement, an agreement on policy for the occupation and reconstruction of Germany
Potsdam Conference, a World War II conference
Potsdam Declaration, a statement calling for the Surrender of Japan in World War II

Other
Potsdam (film), a 1927 German silent drama film
Potsdam Giants, the Prussian infantry regiment No 6, composed of taller-than-average soldiers
Potsdam Hauptbahnhof, the main railway station of Potsdam
Potsdamer Platz, a central square in Berlin
Potsdam Sandstone, more formally known as the Potsdam Group, is a geologic unit of mid-to-late Cambrian age found in northeastern North America